The Last Producer is a 2000 American drama film directed by and starring Burt Reynolds. It also featured Sean Astin, Ann-Margret, Lauren Holly, Rod Steiger, and Benjamin Bratt. It was also referred to as The Final Hit in final packaging and promotional materials. It is the final film to be directed by Reynolds before his death in 2018.

Plot
Sonny Wexler is an aging, washed-up, veteran film producer with a pill-popping wife. In his heyday, Sonny produced an Oscar nominated movie, but now he finds he's a "has been" in a Hollywood that's been taken over by a younger generation, personified by studio executive Damon Black and foreign investors.

Knowing that he is soon going to die or be forgotten, he decides to wager all his strength in one last movie, something for which he can be remembered. His chance comes in the form of a brilliant screenplay optioned from a promising young writer. But when Black undercuts the deal and eases Sonny out, Sonny has seventy-two hours to come up with enough money to purchase the script for himself. In desperation, he turns to the mafia to borrow the $50,000 he needs.

Cast
 Burt Reynolds as Sonny Wexler
 Rod Steiger as Sheri Ganse
 Benjamin Bratt as Damon Black
 Ann-Margret as Mira Verder
 Lauren Holly as Frances Chadway
 Sean Astin as Bo Pomerantz
 Kim Chase as Teddy
 Charles Durning as Syd Wolf
 Robert Goulet as Henry Moore
 Erin Gray as Dee Freeman
 E. J. Peaker as Rosie
 Robert Costanzo as Moogian
 Arthur Darbinyan as Nidal
 Charles Lanyer as Biderman
 Greg Germann as Ruben Tallridge
 Marnie McPhail as Julia Tallridge
 Paul McCrane as Austin Green
 Marvin J. McIntyre as Manny
 Ed O'Ross as Sarky
 Cynthia Palmer as Maude Chasen
 Jeannette Papineau as Niki
 Angie Dickinson as Poker Player
 Tony Denison as Poker Player (credited as Anthony John Denison)
 James Farentino as Poker Player
 Alex Rocco as Poker Player
 Shelley Berman as Poker Player
 Shecky Greene as Poker Player (credited as Shecky Green)
 Heidi Kaufman as Dancer
 Kimberly Pullis as Cocktail Waitress
 Joe Mantegna as Extra (uncredited)

Production
The film was financed by the Kushner Locke Company.

Filming started May 1999.

Home media
The film was released on home video in Iceland and Argentina in 2000 before airing on television in the U.S. in 2001. It was later re-titled The Last Hit for its U.S. home video release.

References

External links

Review of film at Variety

2000 films
2000 drama films
American drama films
Films about filmmaking
Films directed by Burt Reynolds
Films set in Los Angeles
2001 drama films
2001 films
2000s English-language films
2000s American films